Meus Prêmios Nick ( My Nick Awards), often abbreviated as MPN, is the Brazilian version of the Nickelodeon Kids' Choice Awards (KCA). The event is one of the largest award shows for children's television in the country. The Brazilian version is one of the eleven countries in the world that holds a localised version of the Kids' Choice Awards. The first bout of the Meus Prêmios Nick was held in 2000, hosted by Márcio Garcia.

Ceremonies

Categories

Television 
 Favourite Actress
 Favourite Actor
 Favourite Television Programme
 Favourite Drama 
 Favourite Sitcom

Film 
 Movie of the Year

Music 
 Musician of the Year
 Musical Discovery
 Favourite Band
 Favourite Female Singer
 Favourite Male Singer
 Favourite National Hit
 Favourite International Hit
 Favourite International Artist

Sports 
 Athlete of the Year
 Play of the Year
 Psresom

Beauty 
 Cat of the Year (Female)
 Cat of the Year (Male)
 Trending Topics (TT)

Humour 
 Favourite Comedian

Games 
 Favourite Game

See also

 Latin American television awards
 Nickelodeon Kids' Choice Awards

References 

Nickelodeon Kids' Choice Awards
2000 establishments in Brazil
Brazilian television awards
Awards established in 2000